The Roman Catholic Diocese of Bonfim is a diocese in the Ecclesiastical province of Feira de Santana in northeastern Brazil.

Its episcopal cathedral is Catedral Senhor do Bonfim, dedicated to Our Lord, in the city of Senhor do Bonfim, Bahia state.

History 
 April 6, 1933: Established as Diocese of Bonfim, on territory split off from the Metropolitan Archdiocese of São Salvador da Bahia
 It lost territory thrice : on 1959.11.14 to establish the Diocese of Ruy Barbosa, on 1962.07.22 to establish the Diocese of Juazeiro and on 1971.09.14 to establish the Diocese of Paulo Afonso.

Statistics 
As per 2015, it pastorally served 525,000 Catholics (80.1% of 655,197 total) on 33,747 km² in 25 parishes with 42 priests (22 diocesan, 20 religious), 68 lay religious (21 brothers, 47 sisters) and 15 seminarians .

Episcopal ordinaries 
(all Latin Rite natives)

Suffragan Bishops of Bonfim 
 Hugo Bressane de Araújo (1935.12.19 – 1940.09.19), next Bishop of Guaxupé (Brazil) (1940.09.19 – 1951.09.03), Titular Archbishop of Cotrada (1951.09.03 – 1954.10.07) as Coadjutor Archbishop of Belo Horizonte (Brazil) (1951.09.03 – 1954.10.07), finally Archbishop-Bishop of Diocese of Marilia (Brazil) (1954.10.07 – retired 1975.04.23), died 1988
 Henrique Hector Golland Trindade, Order of Friars Minor (O.F.M.) (1941.03.29 – 1948.05.15); next last suffragan Bishop of Botucatu (Brazil) (1948.05.15 – 1958.04.19), (see) promoted first Metropolitan Archbishop of Botucatu (1958.04.19 – 1968.03.27), retired as Titular Archbishop of Lilibeo (1968.03.27 – 1971.03.16), died 1974
 José Alves de Sà Trindade (1948.09.04 – 1956.05.27), next Bishop of Montes Claros (Brazil) (1956.05.27 – retired 1988.06.01), died 2005
 Antônio de Mendonça Monteiro (1957.03.07 – death 1972.12.23), previously Titular Bishop of Sozusa in Palæstina (1950.01.31 – 1957.03.07) as Auxiliary Bishop of São Salvador da Bahia (Brazil) (1950.01.31 – 1957.03.07)
 Jairo Rui Matos da Silva (1974.01.11 – retired 2006.07.26), died 2007
 Francisco Canindé Palhano (2006.07.26 – 2018.01.03), next Bishop of Petrolina (Brazil) (2018.01.03 – ...)
Hernaldo Pinto Farias, S.S.S. (2019.09.15 - ... )

Sources and References 
 GCatholic.org, data for all sections
 Catholic Hierarchy
 Diocesan official website (Portuguese)

Roman Catholic dioceses in Brazil
Roman Catholic Ecclesiastical Province of Feira de Santana
Roman Catholic dioceses and prelatures established in the 20th century
1933 establishments in Brazil
Religious organizations established in 1933